Below is a list of major tourist attractions in Oxford, England.

Religious sites

 Christ Church Cathedral
 University Church of St Mary the Virgin
 Martyrs' Memorial

Museums and galleries

University of Oxford
 Ashmolean Museum, Britain's oldest museum
 Pitt Rivers Museum
 Museum of Natural History, home of (the remains of) the Oxford dodo
 Museum of the History of Science, in Britain's oldest purpose-built museum building
 Bate Collection of Musical Instruments, St Aldate's

Others
 Museum of Oxford
 Museum of Modern Art
 Science Oxford

University buildings

(Other than the colleges)
 The Bodleian Library
 The Clarendon Building (often used as a set for film and television)
 The Radcliffe Camera (one of several institutions named after John Radcliffe)
 The Sheldonian Theatre
 The Oxford University Press

Open spaces
The floodplains for Oxford's two rivers reach right into the heart of the city, providing a wealth of green spaces.
 The University Parks
 The University Botanic Garden
 Christ Church Meadow
 Port Meadow
 Mesopotamia
 Angel & Greyhound Meadow
 Cutteslowe Park
 South Park
 Warneford Meadow

Theatre
Oxford Playhouse
North Wall Arts Centre

See also
 Oxford
 Oxford University

External links

Oxford
Attractions
Oxford